Half a True Day is the thirteenth studio album by experimental music ensemble Biota, released on November 26, 2007 by ReR Megacorp.

Track listing

Personnel 
Adapted from the Half a True Day liner notes.

Biota
 Steve Emmons – electronics
 Kristianne Gale – guitar, spoken word
 James Gardner – flugelhorn
 Rolf Goranson – tape, electronics, spoken word
 Tom Katsimpalis – guitar, bass guitar, clavioline, tape, ektara, mixing
 Andy Kredt – guitar
 Randy Miotke – Rhodes piano, engineering, mastering
 Mark Piersel – guitar
 Steve Scholbe – guitar, bass guitar, rubab
 William Sharp – tape, electronics, engineering, mixing, design
 C.W. Vrtacek – piano
 Gordon H. Whitlow – accordion, Rhodes piano, autoharp, khene
 Larry Wilson – drums, congas, mbira, tabla, percussion, mixing, design
 Randy Yeates – Micromoog, keyboards
 David Zekman – violin, mandolin

Production and additional personnel
 Biota – production, mixing, arrangements
 Jerry Schneyer – engineering

Release history

References

External links 
 Half a True Day at Discogs (list of releases)

2007 albums
Biota (band) albums
Recommended Records albums